This Better Be Good is a compilation album by Paul Simon, issued in June 2009 on the Starbucks Entertainment record label in its Opus Collection series (catalog number OPCD-8321). The disc was exclusively available at US branches of the Starbucks stores. The tracks on this album were taken from all of Paul's solo albums (except The Paul Simon Songbook), up to and including the 2006 release Surprise.

The iTunes version of the album included the bonus track, "Questions for the Angels". It was a new track that had not been released in any other form. In 2011, it appeared on Simon's new studio album, So Beautiful or So What. The album was listed on the Billboard 200 in August 2009.

Track listing
 Kodachrome
 Peace like a River
 Loves Me like a Rock
 Late in the Evening
 Slip Slidin' Away
 Me and Julio Down by the Schoolyard
 Diamonds on the Soles of her Shoes
 Mother and Child Reunion
 American Tune
 Under African Skies
 Senorita with a Necklace of Tears
 Bernadette
 Train in the Distance
 The Obvious Child
 Father and Daughter
 Sure Don't Feel like Love
 Questions for the Angels  (iTunes bonus track; available only on iTunes; not included in the CD version)

Chart performance
The album debuted on the Billboard 200 albums chart at number 60 on July 11, 2009, which was also its peak position. It peaked at number 5 on the Billboard Top Independent Albums chart.

References

2009 compilation albums
Paul Simon compilation albums
Hear Music compilation albums